Ole Kristian Silseth (born 1 October 1959) is a Norwegian former professional racing cyclist. He won the Norwegian National Road Race Championship in 1982.

References

External links
 

1959 births
Living people
Norwegian male cyclists
Cyclists from Oslo